Conway Cemetery Historic State Park, officially the Conway Cemetery State Park, is the final resting place of James S. Conway, first governor of Arkansas, and his wife, Mary J. Conway. It is a  Arkansas state park in Lafayette County. No recreational or visitors' amenities are available at the state park.

Description and administrative history
The Conway-Johnson family dominated Arkansas politics from territorial days until the American Civil War. James Sevier Conway was the first governor of Arkansas, serving from 1836 to 1840. He began many basic state programs, such as banks, roads, and prisons. Conway retired to his plantation near Bradley, where he died in 1855. Several other prominent figures in early Arkansas politics were buried in the cemetery, including U.S. Senator Ambrose Hundley Sevier.

Locals succeeded in acquiring state protection of the site with the passing of legislation acquiring the site in 1975. After receiving listing on the National Register of Historic Places two years later, the cemetery was given to the Department of Parks, Heritage, and Tourism on March 27, 1984. After paving of a parking lot and addition of picnic tables, the park was admitted to the park system in 1986. The park encompasses the old homesite and family cemetery of the Conway family.

See also 
 List of Arkansas state parks
 List of National Historic Landmarks in Arkansas
 National Register of Historic Places listings in Lafayette County, Arkansas

References

External links
 
 
  

1986 establishments in Arkansas
Buildings and structures in Lafayette County, Arkansas
Cemeteries on the National Register of Historic Places in Arkansas
James Sevier Conway
National Register of Historic Places in Lafayette County, Arkansas
Protected areas established in 1986
Protected areas of Lafayette County, Arkansas
State parks of Arkansas